Yermil Ivanovich Kostrov (c. 1755 – 1796) was the first to translate the Iliad into Russian. His father was a peasant from the Vyatka Governorate. Kostrov was educated in the Slavic Greek Latin Academy and received an annual pension from the Moscow University for odes and other poems he would write for special occasions. He lived in abject poverty and was prone to alcoholism. Apart from light verse and a book of odes, he also produced the first Russian translations of Ossian's poems and The Golden Ass.

External links
 
 Kostrov's translation of The Iliad

Poets from the Russian Empire
Male writers from the Russian Empire
Russian male poets
Translators from the Russian Empire
18th-century poets from the Russian Empire
18th-century male writers
1796 deaths
Translators of Homer
Year of birth uncertain
Translators to Russian